The following is a list of players of the mbira, an African plucked lamellophone musical instrument.

Traditional Zimbabwean mbira masters 
Tendayi Gahamadze
Thomas Mapfumo 
Chartwell Dutiro
Cosmas Magaya
Dumisani and Chiwoniso Maraire
Ephat Mujuru
Forward Kwenda
Garikayi Tirikoti
Jah Prayzah
Mbira dzeNharira
Mbuya Dyoko
Musekiwa Chingodza
Oliver Mtukudzi
Stella Chiweshe
Anna Mudeka

Other mbira players 

Chris Berry
David Bowie
Erica Azim
Genesis- Guitarist Steve Hackett played some parts of kalimba on the Wind and Wuthering album. 
Glenn Kotche of Wilco
Jamie Muir of King Crimson
Hope Masike
Imogen Heap
Konono No.1
Lisa Hannigan
Mal Webb
Maurice White and Philip Bailey of Earth, Wind, & Fire
Njacko Backo
Phil Collins on the album No Jacket Required, the song "Long Long Way to Go" with Sting on backing vocals
Prince Kudakwashe Musarurwa
Tendai Maraire of Shabazz Palaces
Tinashé
Trent Reznor of Nine Inch Nails
Francis Bebey

Mbira